Righteous Love is Joan Osborne's second studio album and fourth overall. It was released on September 12, 2000 by Interscope Records.

Track listing
"Running Out of Time" (Osborne, Louie Pérez) – 4:45
"Righteous Love" (Osborne, Joseph Arthur) – 4:15
"Safety in Numbers" (Osborne, Erik Della Penna) – 4:27
"Love Is Alive" (Gary Wright) – 3:29
"Angel Face" (Osborne, Arthur, Pérez, Andreas Uetz) – 3:35
"Grand Illusion" (Osborne, Penna, Rainy Orteca, Jack Petruzzelli) – 4:02
"If I Was Your Man" (Osborne, Arthur, Pérez, Rick Chertoff, Rob Hyman) – 4:57
"Baby Love" (Osborne, Orteca, Penna, Petruzzelli) – 4:16
"Hurricane" (Osborne, Michael Mangini, Penna, Petruzzelli) – 4:17
"Poison Apples (Hallelujah)" (Osborne, Hyman, Chertoff) – 4:19
"Make You Feel My Love" (Bob Dylan) – 4:01
Track 9 was spelled as "" on album track listing. Correct title is "Hurricane".

Personnel
Adapted from allmusic.
Joan Osborne – vocals, Vox organ
Joseph Arthur, Erik Della Penna – guitars
David Immerglück – baritone guitar, pedal steel, banjo
Val McCallum – guitars, backing vocals
Aaron Comess – bass guitar, drums, percussion
Mitchell Froom – keyboards
Davey Faragher – bass, backing vocals
Carla Azar – drums
Pete Thomas – drums, percussion
Steve Berlin, Erik Lawrence – saxophone
Charlie Bisharat, Joel Derouin, Suzie Katayama – strings
Larry Corbett, Matt Funes, Michele Richards – strings, backing vocals

References

External links
 

2000 albums
Joan Osborne albums
Albums produced by Mitchell Froom
Interscope Records albums